Muzaffar Ahmed Mahavidyalaya, established in 1986, is a general degree college situated at Salar in Murshidabad district in the state of West Bengal, India. It offers undergraduate courses in arts. It is affiliated to  University of Kalyani.

Departments

Bengali
English
Sanskrit
Arabic
History
Geography
Political Science
Sociology
Education

Accreditation
The college is recognized by the University Grants Commission (UGC).

See also

References

External links
University of Kalyani
University Grants Commission
National Assessment and Accreditation Council

Colleges affiliated to University of Kalyani
Educational institutions established in 1986
Universities and colleges in Murshidabad district
1986 establishments in West Bengal